Bryan King may refer to:

 Bryan King (footballer, born 1947), English footballer
 Bryan King (politician) (born 1968), member of the Arkansas Senate
 Bryan King (Australian footballer) (born 1935), Australian rules footballer

See also
 Brian King (disambiguation)